Piero Pisenti (March 20, 1887 – September 29, 1980) was an Italian Fascist journalist and politician.

Pisenti was born in Perugia, Umbria, to a family of university professors. In 1912 he graduated in jurisprudence at the University of Bologna. The following year he moved to Pordenone, Friuli, where he began his political career as a member of the town council, which he held from 1915 to 1919, elected on conservative list. In 1920 he founded in Pordenone the far right party Unione del Lavoro (Labour Union), which was later absorbed into the National Fascist Party (PNF).

He entered the PNF in 1921, and soon became a captain of the Blackshirts in Friuli, as well as a national-level figure of Fascism, and editor of Giornale del Friuli.

In 1926 Pisenti was expelled from the PNF, as he disagreed on some internal regulations of the party. The following year, however, he was readmitted into high office, becoming one of Benito Mussolini's closest collaborators (Mussolini described him as "the man who, throughout twenty years of Fascism, has had the bravery of his very own brilliant heterodoxy"). In 1924 he was elected as to the Italian Chamber of Deputies, a position he held without interruptions until 1939.

After the armistice of September 8, 1943, he remained loyal to Mussolini, and joined the leadership of the Italian Social Republic - in November of that year, he was appointed its Minister of Justice. In this position, he refused to pardon the former Fascist leaders who had organized the fall of Mussolini in 1943 (including Galeazzo Ciano, Emilio De Bono and Carlo Pareschi), and who were sentenced to death in the Verona trial.<ref>I Montanelli,Storia d'Italia 1943-1948 pag 98, RCS editore, 2003</ref>

After the end of World War II, Pisenti was arrested and jailed for a year. After the sentence was carried out, he returned to Pordenone and worked as a lawyer. In 1977 he wrote the controversial essay RSI - Una Repubblica necessaria'' ("The RSI [Italian Social Republic] - A Necessary Republic"), in which he defended the politics of the Republic.

Pisenti died in Pordenone in 1980.

References 

1887 births
1980 deaths
People from Perugia
People of the Italian Social Republic
Italian male journalists
University of Bologna alumni
Alpini
Italian anti-communists
20th-century Italian journalists
20th-century Italian male writers